"Followed the Waves" is the first single from Auf der Maur's self-titled solo debut. The song peaked in the Top 40 on the chart for Modern Rock Tracks in the United States and also reached the Top 40 in the United Kingdom, only charting two positions lower than the follow-up single, "Real a Lie".

Background and production
"Followed the Waves" was one of the many songs written by Melissa Auf der Maur over a 12-year period from 1992 to 2004. The song was featured as the second track on Auf der Maur, following "Lightning Is My Girl".

Track listing and formats
UK CD single
"Followed the Waves" – 4:48 (Melissa Auf der Maur)
"Good News" – 4:21 (Auf der Maur)

US CD single
"Followed the Waves" – 4:48
"Good News" – 4:21
"My Foggy Notion" (demo version) – 4:13 (Auf der Maur)
** Limited Maxi single editions include an enhanced video of the music video for "Followed the Waves."

Limited UK 7" vinyl single<ref name="Discogs.com, Auf der Maur* – Followed the Waves (7, Single, Ltd, Blu) at Discogs http://www.discogs.com/Auf-der-Maur-Followed-The-Waves/release/565462 Retrieved on June 20, 2010.">Auf der Maur* – Followed the Waves (7", Single, Ltd, Blu) at Discogs http://www.discogs.com/Auf-der-Maur-Followed-The-Waves/release/565462 Retrieved on June 20, 2010.</ref>
"Followed the Waves" – 4:48
"Good News" – 4:21

European promo CD
"Followed the Waves" (radio edit) – 3:24
"Followed the Waves" (album version) – 4:48

Music video
A promotional music for the single was recorded in 2004. The video features Auf der Maur performing "Followed the Waves" and includes many images of a ship sailing through a storm, a theme that would later reoccur on "Follow the Map", a song from her second studio album, Out of Our Minds''. Throughout the video, Auf der Maur and her band also perform on an orange backdrop, similar to the album's cover art.

Chart positions

Personnel

Musicians and performers
Melissa Auf der Maur – lead vocals, bass, additional guitar
Steve Durand  – lead guitar
Chris Goss – additional guitar, backing vocals
Jordon Zadorozny – additional guitar
Jeordie White – additional guitar
Brant Bjork – drums
John Stanier – additional drums
Nick Oliveri – additional bass, backing vocals
Kelli Scott – additional drums
Atom Willard – additional drums

Production
Chris Goss – producer, engineer
Melissa Auf der Maur – additional production
Martin Schmelzle – engineer
Matt Mahaffey – engineer, mixer (on "Good News")
Ben Grosse – mixer

References

2004 singles
Melissa Auf der Maur songs
Capitol Records singles
Songs written by Melissa Auf der Maur
2004 songs